The Battle of Fire Support Base Ripcord was a 23-day battle between elements of the U.S. Army 101st Airborne Division and two reinforced divisions of the People's Army of Vietnam (PAVN) that took place from 1 to 23 July 1970. It was the last major confrontation between United States ground forces and the PAVN during the Vietnam War. Three Medals of Honor and six Distinguished Service Crosses were awarded to participants for actions during the operations.

Background
President Nixon began the withdrawal of troops from Vietnam in 1969. As the only full-strength division remaining in Vietnam in early 1970, the 101st Airborne Division was ordered to conduct the planned offensive Operation Texas Star near the A Shau Valley.

On 12 March 1970, the 3rd Brigade, 101st Airborne under the command of Colonel Ben Harrison, began rebuilding abandoned Fire Support Base Ripcord which relied, as the most remote bases at the time, on a helicopter lifeline to get supplies and personnel in and out. The firebase was to be used to support Operation Chicago Peak, a planned offensive by the 101st Airborne to destroy PAVN supply bases in the A Shau Valley.

Battle

 
On 1 July, elements of the 2nd Battalion, 506th Infantry Regiment received eight 82mm rounds, an unknown number of 60mm mortar rounds and ten 75mm recoilless rounds fired by elements of the PAVN 803rd Regiment, 324B Division. Artillery was fired on the suspected enemy locations killing three PAVN. Nearby on the next day, the night defensive position of the 2/506th was attacked by elements of the 803rd Regiment using Rocket-propelled grenades (RPGs), small arms fire and satchel charges. PAVN losses were fifteen killed while U.S. losses were eight killed and one missing.

On 10 July at 11:25 B Company was subjected to a 38-round mixed 60 and 82mm mortar barrage,  killing two soldiers. On 18 July a CH-47C from the 159th Assault Helicopter Battalion was shot down by PAVN small arms fire. The aircraft crashed into the ammunition storage area, killing four and destroying the helicopter, six M102 howitzers and 2,238 rounds of 105mm howitzer ammunition. On 19 July elements of the PAVN 803rd Regiment again hit the base with mortar fire. On a search operation 20 July, D Company/1/506th, sustained mortar fire killing one. On 21 July at 07:10, D Company received an attack-by-fire consisting of 80 rounds of 82mm mortar. The mortar and small arms fire continued until 16:15. D Company returned fire and with airstrikes and helicopter gunship fire held the PAVN off. D Company moved from the base and linked up with D Company 506th. Eight PAVN were killed while the U.S. lost one killed. Meanwhile, at 06:50, B Company was hit by six 82mm mortar rounds. At 10:04 the base received 10 more rounds and was hit again six and a half hours later, with a loss of four killed in the attacks. On 22 July at 13:00, A Company 2/506th, while on a search-and-clear operation received an enemy attack; airstrikes and artillery supported the company. When the contact broke at 19:30, the U.S. had lost 12 killed while PAVN losses were 61 killed.

Losses of U.S. forces were so great that officers began asking for volunteers from other units to go to Ripcord and reinforce the firebase. Finally, the U.S. command realized that the position was not defensible, and the decision was made to withdraw. On 23 July at 06:30 the PAVN again attacked the remaining elements who were evacuating the base. The 2nd Battalion returned the fire and aerial rocket artillery, gunships and airstrikes reinforced. When contact terminated, U.S. casualties were three killed (including the commanding officer Lieutenant Colonel Andre Lucas and the S-3). Ripcord was evacuated and abandoned on 23 July.

After the garrison withdrew from the base, B-52 bombers were sent in to carpet bomb the area.

Aftermath
During the 23-day siege, 75 U.S. soldiers were killed at Ripcord. First Lieutenant Bob Kalsu was the only contemporaneously active pro athlete to be killed during the war. Andre Lucas was posthumously awarded the Medal of Honor. Ben Harrison claimed that the PAVN losses at Ripcord crippled their offensive capability for two full years, resulting in the delaying of their Easter Offensive from 1971 to 1972.

See also
 Firebase Henderson

Books
"Ripcord: Screaming Eagles Under Siege, Vietnam 1970" by Keith W. Nolan, Presidio Press, 2000, 
"The Price of Exit", by Tom Marshall, Ballantine Books, 1998. 
"The Sentinel and the Shooter", by Douglas W. Bonnot, 2010.

Articles
Rescue From FSB Ripcord, by Tom Marshall
archived copy of Rescue From FSB Ripcord, by Tom Marshall

Video
"Siege at Firebase Ripcord", War Stories with Oliver North, Fox News Productions, product # FOX25004600

References

External links

FSB Ripcord Association - Archived quarterly publication The Ripcord Report

Conflicts in 1970
1970 in Vietnam
Fire Support Base Ripcord
Battles involving the United States
Fire Support Base Ripcord
Battles and operations of the Vietnam War in 1970
July 1970 events in Asia
History of Thừa Thiên Huế province